Mr. Accident is a 2000 Australian comedy film written, directed, produced by, and starring Yahoo Serious. It was filmed in September and October 1998 in Sydney.

Plot
Roger Crumpkin is a young, accident-prone maintenance man at an egg factory that bears an uncanny resemblance to the Sydney Opera House. He stumbles on his boss's plan to increase sales by lacing the eggs with nicotine. Crumpkin must risk his job and girlfriend to stop him. In the meantime Crumpkin and his UFO-obsessed girlfriend, Sunday Valentine (Helen Dallimore) discover in ancient sedimentary rock a metal object that bears an uncanny resemblance to the wheelcap (hubcap) from a Volkswagen Beetle.

Soundtrack
"Hot Hot Hot" (Cassell) Arrow
"Welcome" (Rumour/Perkins) The Cruel Sea
"Buster" (Spiderbait) Spiderbait
"Mysterioso-so" (Haymes, Kelly, Raglus, Roberts) The Feeling Groovies
"Godfather of Cool" (Tom Carlyon) Luxedo
"Mambo UK" (Jesus Alemany) Cubanismo
"Eggs Benedict'em" (Serious, Roach, Tyson-Chew) Victorian Philharmonic & Melbourne Chorale
"Wall of Skank" (Haymes, Kelly, Raglus, Roberts) The Feeling Groovies
"I'm In Love with My Car" (Reg Mombassa) Mental as Anything
"Afrobras" (Alves) Luciano Alves
"Theta State" (Cartright, Keiller) sonicanimation
"Universally Lonely" (N. Tyson-Chew) Victorian Philharmonic
"Moon River" (Mancini) Henry Mancini
"Kid Indestructible (28 Days) 28 Days
"Oh Dear! Oh No! Uh Oh! (Serious, Roach, Tyson-Chew) Victorian Philharmonic & Melbourne Chorale
"Roger On Sunday" (N. Tyson Chew) Victorian Philharmonic

Reception
Mr. Accident grossed $1,612,424 at the box office in Australia,.

The film holds a 17% approval rating at Rotten Tomatoes, based on 6 reviews (5 negative, 1 positive).

See also
 Cinema of Australia

References

External links
 
 Mr Accident at Oz Movies
 Mr. Accident at the National Film and Sound Archive

2000 films
2000 comedy films
Australian comedy films
Films set in Australia
2000s English-language films
Metro-Goldwyn-Mayer films
Films scored by Nerida Tyson-Chew
Films directed by Yahoo Serious
2000s Australian films